Here Come the Nelsons is a 1952 American comedy film starring real-life husband and wife Ozzie and Harriet Nelson and their sons David and Ricky Nelson.  The supporting cast includes Rock Hudson, Sheldon Leonard, Jim Backus, Gale Gordon, and Chubby Johnson. The film was directed by Frederick de Cordova.

Here Come the Nelsons doubled as the pilot for the television series The Adventures of Ozzie and Harriet.

Premise
When Ozzie tries to get some publicity for an ad agency, David and Ricky get mixed up with gangsters.

Cast

 Ozzie Nelson as Ozzie Nelson
 Harriet Nelson as Harriet Nelson
 David Nelson	as David Nelson
 Ricky Nelson as Ricky Nelson
 Rock Hudson as Charles E. "Charlie" Jones
 Barbara Lawrence as Barbara Schutzendorf
 Sheldon Leonard as Duke	
 Jim Backus as Joe Randolph
 Paul Harvey as Samuel T. Jones
 Gale Gordon as H.J. Bellows
 Ann Doran as Clara Randolph
 Chubby Johnson as Tex, Man at Fair
 Edwin Max as Monk

External links
 

1952 films
1952 comedy films
American comedy films
American black-and-white films
Films directed by Frederick de Cordova
Films based on radio series
Universal Pictures films
American television series premieres
1950s English-language films
1950s American films